Chimerica is a Channel 4 four-part drama that aired in April 2019, based on the play of the same name by Lucy Kirkwood.

Plot
A young photojournalist captures a photo of the Tank Man in Beijing during the 1989 Tiananmen Square protests and massacre. Twenty years later, he goes on a journey to discover the man's true identity.

Cast
Alessandro Nivola as Lee Berger
Cherry Jones as Mel Kincaid
Sophie Okonedo as Tessa Kendrick
F. Murray Abraham as Frank Sams
Terry Chen as Zhang Lin
Katie Leung as Liuli
Vera Chok as Shen

Episodes list

See also

References

External links
Chimerica on IMDb

2019 British television series debuts
2019 British television series endings
2010s British drama television series
2010s British television miniseries
Channel 4 television dramas
English-language television shows
1989 Tiananmen Square protests and massacre